Catholic Theological College (CTC) is one of the constituent theological colleges of the University of Divinity, an Australian collegiate university of specialisation in divinity. The college is located in East Melbourne, Victoria.

History 
Catholic Theological College was established in 1972 when a group of dioceses and religious institutes agreed to act together as a confederated body in academic matters. In 1973 the college became a Recognised Teaching Institution of the Melbourne College of Divinity (now the University of Divinity) and thereby authorised to teach the Bachelor of Theology.

Cardinal James Knox (1914-1983) was the driving force behind the establishment of a central Catholic college in Melbourne, rather than maintaining separate seminaries for diocesan priests and religious institutes. The successful outcome provided enhanced theological education for seminarians and lay students, with degrees awarded through the Melbourne College of Divinity. Knox's initiatives required major building works, with existing seminaries eventually replaced with a new complex in Clayton. This site was selected for its close proximity to Monash University, and provided diocesan students with the opportunity to gain a university degree in the course of their studies.

The new site opened in 1973 with Catholic Theological College co-located with the new Corpus Christi College seminary. CTC had its own head of college, known as the master, and was attended by students from Corpus Christi College and other seminaries, religious sisters and brothers, as well as lay people. In CTC's first year, invitations were sent out to the superiors of religious institutes, inviting them to send students to study theology. The religious sisters in particular readily accepted this invitation and over the years have been among the college's major supporters.

Although Knox's vision for a single Catholic college in which all seminaries were involved was only partially fulfilled, his innovations were a great improvement on previous fragmentation. Since 1978, the college has held an annual Knox Public Lecture, acknowledging Cardinal Knox's original vision for its foundation. Notable presenters of the Knox Public Lecture include: Archbishop Stylianos of Australia in 1989, Alan Jones in 1992, Davis McCaughey in 1993, Keith Rayner in 1995, Michael Tate in 1997 and Margaret Manion in 2001. The main classroom at CTC is also named in Knox's honour. 

In 2000, Catholic Theological College's new building in East Melbourne was officially opened. The new Thomas Carr Centre, which incorporated administration, faculty offices and the Mannix Library, adjoined a 1870s neo-Gothic building that was formerly the Christian Brothers' Cathedral College. Melbourne-based architect Gregory Burgess created the design that brought the two buildings together. Gregory Burgess Architects  received several awards for the construction of the Catholic Theological College building. These included the Royal Australian Institute of Architects (VIC) Commendation: The Melbourne Prize in 2000 and the Australian Property Institute, Heritage Property Award in 2001.

Masters of the college 

 Austin Cooper OMI AM - 1972–1976, 1992–1994, 1998-2002 Cooper was made a Member of the Order of Australia on 26 January 2004 for service to education and scholarship, particularly through the Melbourne College of Divinity, and to the community through the Oblates of Mary Immaculate Congregation.
 Gerard Diamond - 1977-1983
 John Begley SJ - 1983-1985
 Norman Ford SDB - 1986-1991
 Mark Coleridge - 1995-1997
 Terence Curtin - 2003-2010
 Shane Mackinlay - 2011-2019
 Kevin Lenehan - 2019-current

The following Masters of CTC also served as presidents of the Melbourne College of Divinity.

 Austin Cooper OMI AM - 1976-1977
 Norman Ford SDB - 1991-1992
 Terence Curtin - 2010-2011

Austin Cooper OMI AM and Norman Ford SDB were also elected as fellows of the Melbourne College of Divinity in 1990 and 2001 respectively.

Affiliated seminaries 
Catholic Theological College is a federation of the following autonomous seminaries based in Melbourne:

 Corpus Christi College (diocesan seminary for Victoria and Tasmania), Carlton
 St Joseph of Cupertino Friary (Order of Friars Minor Conventual), Dingley
 St Dominic's Priory (Order of Preachers), Camberwell
 John Paul II House of Formation (Missionaries of God's Love), Burwood 
 St Mary's Seminary (Missionary Oblates of Mary Immaculate), Camberwell
 Don Bosco House (Salesians of Don Bosco), Clifton Hill 
 Salvatorian Formation House (Society of the Divine Saviour), Alphington
 Faber House Community (Society of Jesus), Parkville

Notable alumni and faculty 
 Bernadette Keating PVBM
Bill Daniel SJ, 1930–1994
Christopher Prowse
Clare Johnson, alumni and now director of the ACU Centre for Liturgy
Frances Baker RSM, alumni and former deputy master
Francis Moloney
 John Scullion SJ, 1925–1990
 Mark Coleridge
 Mark Edwards OMI
Race Mathews
 Richard Divall, 1945-2017
Robyn Horner
 Shane Mackinlay
 Timothy Costelloe SDB
Tony Ireland

References

External links 

 

Education in Melbourne
Educational institutions established in 1972
Seminaries and theological colleges in Australia
Catholic universities and colleges in Australia
1972 establishments in Australia
Buildings and structures in the City of Melbourne (LGA)
East Melbourne, Victoria
University of Divinity